The 1976 National Challenge Cup was the 63rd edition of the USSF's annual open soccer championship. Teams from the North American Soccer League declined to participate.  The San Francisco I.A.C. defeated the New York Inter-Giuliana of New York City in the final game. It was Inter-Giuliana's second consecutive trip to the National Cup finals that they lost.

References

External links
 1976 U.S. Open Cup – TheCup.us

Lamar Hunt U.S. Open Cup
U.S. Open Cup